The Rocky Mount Phillies were a baseball team, a Class-A affiliate of the Philadelphia Phillies from 1973 through 1975. They played in the Carolina League and won the league championship in 1975. The Rocky Mount Phillies replaced the Rocky Mount Leafs, which had been affiliated with the Detroit Tigers from 1965 through 1972. The club played at Rocky Mount Municipal Stadium in Rocky Mount, North Carolina.

Further reading

Philadelphia Phillies minor league affiliates
Rocky Mount, North Carolina
Baseball teams established in 1973
Defunct Carolina League teams
Professional baseball teams in North Carolina
Baseball teams disestablished in 1975
1973 establishments in North Carolina
1975 disestablishments in North Carolina
Defunct baseball teams in North Carolina